Israel Sutino Kaikilekofe is a Wallisian Weightlifter who has represented Wallis and Futuna at the Pacific Games and Pacific Mini Games.

Kaikilekofe has been weightlifting since the age of eight.

At the 2017 Pacific Mini Games he won a gold and two silvers in the 85kg class.

At the 2019 Pacific Games in Apia he won a gold and two silvers in the 96kg class. He came 31st in the 96kg class at the 2019 World Weightlifting Championships.

References

Living people
1997 births
Wallis and Futuna weightlifters